Jason Daniel "Danny" Roberts (born July 19, 1977) is a recruiter and television personality best known for appearing on The Real World: New Orleans in 2000.

Career
Roberts graduated from Rockmart High School in 1995.  Roberts studied foreign language education while attending the University of Georgia, where he graduated from in 1999.

Real World
Prior to beginning the show, he had recently begun a relationship with Paul Dill, a US Army captain  stationed in Vicenza, Italy. Because of the U.S. Military "Don't ask, don't tell" policy toward homosexuals, Paul's face was obscured on TV and much national attention was brought to the issue.  In early 2004, MTV aired a special where Paul (then out of the military) revealed his face for the first time and the policy and its effects were discussed.  In November 2006, Roberts announced in The Advocate magazine that he and Dill had split up.

Post Real World
Roberts made a few post-Real World appearances on television such as Dawson's Creek, Netflix's DTLA, and hosted the DVD collection of gay-themed short films, Boy's Briefs.

Roberts spoke at schools across the country on diversity in sexuality, coming out, public policy, and the military's "Don't ask, Don't tell" policy for several years after his first TV appearance in addition to other LGBTQ advocacy work.

After spending 10 years in New York and Seattle, Roberts returned to Atlanta, Georgia, where he worked in human resource recruiting for an email software company called MailChimp, where he worked from 2014 until 2017.  He previously worked as a recruiter for Redfin, a residential real estate company.  As of 2017, Roberts is a Senior Talent Recruiter at InVision App, the digital design tool, in Boston, Massachusetts.

Roberts currently lives in Grafton, Vermont.

Personal life
Danny divorced Wes Pereria in 2018 Boston, MA.  Together, they are the co-parents of an adopted daughter, Naiya Sage.

In 2018, Roberts revealed in an interview with Entertainment Weekly that he was HIV positive since 2011.

TV appearances
 DTLA (2012)
 Reality TV Secrets Revealed (2004)
 MTV News: Out in the Real World (2003)
 Boys Briefs 2 (2002)
 Real World/Road Rules Challenge: Battle of the Seasons (2002)
 Dawson's Creek - Episode: Coming Home (2000) French Exchange Student
 The Real World: New Orleans (2000)
 The Real World Homecoming: New Orleans (2022)

References

External links 
 
 Danny Roberts Interview

1977 births
University of Georgia alumni
Living people
American gay actors
People with HIV/AIDS
The Real World (TV series) cast members
Male actors from Georgia (U.S. state)
People from Rockmart, Georgia
The Challenge (TV series) contestants
21st-century LGBT people